Nanjin Township is a rural township in Anhua County, Hunan Province, People's Republic of China.

Administrative division
The township is divided into 14 villages, the following areas: Nanjin Village, Baotai Village, Lianwan Village, Baotashan Village, Youfu Village, Sanlong Village, Jiangjun Village, Qibai Village, Xiejia Village, Jiulongchi Village, Huamu Village, Hexing Village, Pixi Village, and Tiankou Village (南金村、包台村、连湾村、宝塔山村、有福村、三龙村、将军村、七百村、卸甲村、九龙池村、花木村、合兴村、毗溪村、田口村).

References

External links

Divisions of Anhua County